Java Platform, Micro Edition or Java ME is a computing platform for development and deployment of portable code for embedded and mobile devices (micro-controllers, sensors, gateways, mobile phones, personal digital assistants, TV set-top boxes, printers). Java ME was formerly known as Java 2 Platform, Micro Edition or J2ME. As of December 22, 2006, the Java ME source code is licensed under the GNU General Public License, and is released under the project name phoneME.

The platform uses the object-oriented Java programming language. It is part of the Java software-platform family. Java ME was designed by Sun Microsystems, acquired by Oracle Corporation in 2010; the platform replaced a similar technology, PersonalJava. Originally developed under the Java Community Process as JSR 68, the different flavors of Java ME have evolved in separate JSRs. Oracle provides a reference implementation of the specification, but has tended not to provide free binary implementations of its Java ME runtime environment for mobile devices, rather relying on third parties to provide their own. As of 2008, all Java ME platforms are currently restricted to JRE 1.3 features and use that version of the class file format (internally known as version 47.0). Should Oracle ever declare a new round of Java ME configuration versions that support the later class file formats and language features, such as those corresponding to JRE 1.5 or 1.6 (notably, generics), it will entail extra work on the part of all platform vendors to update their JREs.

Java ME devices implement a profile. The most common of these are the Mobile Information Device Profile aimed at mobile devices, such as cell phones, and the Personal Profile aimed at consumer products and embedded devices like set-top boxes and PDAs. Profiles are subsets of configurations, of which there are currently two: the Connected Limited Device Configuration (CLDC) and the Connected Device Configuration (CDC).

There are more than 2.1 billion Java ME enabled mobile phones and PDAs. It was popular in sub-$200 devices such as Nokia's Series 40. It was also used on the Bada operating system and on Symbian OS along with native software. Users of Windows CE, Windows Mobile, Maemo, MeeGo and Android can download Java ME for their respective environments ("proof-of-concept" for Android).

Connected Limited Device Configuration 

The Connected Limited Device Configuration (CLDC) contains a strict subset of the Java-class libraries, and is the minimum amount needed for a Java virtual machine to operate. CLDC is basically used for classifying myriad devices into a fixed configuration.

A configuration provides the most basic set of libraries and virtual-machine features that must be present in each implementation of a J2ME environment. When coupled with one or more profiles, the Connected Limited Device Configuration gives developers a solid Java platform for creating applications for consumer and embedded devices.
The configuration is designed for devices with 160KB to 512KB total memory, which has a minimum of 160KB of ROM and 32KB of RAM available for the Java platform.

Mobile Information Device Profile 
Designed for mobile phones, the Mobile Information Device Profile includes a GUI, and a data storage API, and MIDP 2.0 includes a basic 2D gaming API. Applications written for this profile are called MIDlets. Almost all new cell phones come with a MIDP implementation, and it is now the de facto standard for downloadable cell phone games. However, many cellphones can run only those MIDlets that have been approved by the carrier, especially in North America.

JSR 271: Mobile Information Device Profile 3 (Final release on Dec 9, 2009) specified the 3rd generation Mobile Information Device Profile (MIDP3), expanding upon the functionality in all areas as well as improving interoperability across devices. A key design goal of MIDP3 is backward compatibility with MIDP2 content.

Information Module Profile 
The Information Module Profile (IMP) is a profile for embedded, "headless" devices such as vending machines, industrial embedded applications, security systems, and similar devices with either simple or no display and with some limited network connectivity.

Originally introduced by Siemens Mobile and Nokia as JSR-195, IMP 1.0 is a strict subset of MIDP 1.0 except that it doesn't include user interface APIs — in other words, it doesn't include support for the Java package javax.microedition.lcdui. JSR-228, also known as IMP-NG, is IMP's next generation that is based on MIDP 2.0, leveraging MIDP 2.0's new security and networking types and APIs, and other APIs such as PushRegistry and platformRequest(), but again it doesn't include UI APIs, nor the game API.

Connected Device Configuration 

The Connected Device Configuration is a subset of Java SE, containing almost all the libraries that are not GUI related. It is richer than CLDC.

Foundation Profile 
The Foundation Profile is a Java ME Connected Device Configuration (CDC) profile. This profile is intended to be used by devices requiring a complete implementation of the Java virtual machine up to and including the entire Java Platform, Standard Edition API. Typical implementations will use some subset of that API set depending on the additional profiles supported. This specification was developed under the Java Community Process.

Personal Basis Profile 
The Personal Basis Profile extends the Foundation Profile to include lightweight GUI support in the form of an AWT subset. This is the platform that BD-J is built upon.

Implementations 
Sun provides a reference implementation of these configurations and profiles for MIDP and CDC. Starting with the JavaME 3.0 SDK, a NetBeans-based IDE will support them in a single IDE.

In contrast to the numerous binary implementations of the Java Platform built by Sun for servers and workstations, Sun does not provide any binaries for the platforms of Java ME targets with the exception of an MIDP 1.0 JRE (JVM) for Palm OS. Sun provides no J2ME JRE for the Microsoft Windows Mobile (Pocket PC) based devices, despite an open-letter campaign to Sun to release a rumored internal implementation of PersonalJava known by the code name "Captain America". Third party implementations  are widely used by Windows Mobile vendors.

Operating systems targeting Java ME have been implemented by DoCoMo in the form of DoJa, and by SavaJe as SavaJe OS. The latter company was purchased by Sun in April 2007 and now forms the basis of Sun's JavaFX Mobile.

The open-source Mika VM aims to implement JavaME CDC/FP, but is not certified as such (certified implementations are required to charge royalties, which is impractical for an open-source project). Consequently, devices which use this implementation are not allowed to claim JavaME CDC compatibility.

The Linux-based Android operating system uses a proprietary version of Java that is similar in intent, but very different in many ways from Java ME.

JSRs (Java Specification Requests)

Foundation

Main extensions

Future

ESR 
The ESR consortium is devoted to Standards for embedded Java. Especially cost effective Standards.
Typical applications domains are industrial control, machine-to-machine, medical, e-metering, home automation, consumer, human-to-machine-interface, ...

See also 

 Android (operating system)
 iOS
 BlackBerry OS
 Danger Hiptop
 Embedded Java
 JavaFX Mobile
 Mobile development
 Mobile games
 Mobile learning
 Qualcomm Brew
 Smartphone

References 

Notes
 JSR 232: Mobile Operational Management an advanced OSGi technology based platform for mobile computing
 JSR 291: Dynamic Component Support for Java SE symmetric programming model for Java SE to Java ME JSR 232

Bibliography

External links 

 Sun Developer Network, Java ME
 Nokia's Developer Hub Java pages
 Nokia S60 Java Runtime blogs
 Sony Ericsson Developer World
 Motorola Developer Network
 J2ME Authoring Tool LMA Users Network
 Samsung Mobile Developer's site
 Sprint Application Developer's Website
 Performance database of Java ME compatible devices
 MicroEJ platforms for embedded systems
 Book - Mobile Phone Programming using Java ME (J2ME)
 Tutorial Master ng, J2ME

Computing platforms
 
Platform, Micro Edition
Platform, Micro Edition